The Gran Premio de Santa Fe (Santa Fe Grand Prix) is a motorsports race located in the streets of Santa Fe, Santa Fe Province, Argentina. It has hosted events in the TC 2000/Súper TC 2000 championship. It was carried out with a double race format, including a night race. Since 2019 this race has not been held.

Leonel Pernía and Agustín Canapino are the top winners, with four wins each. The fastest lap was made by Néstor Girolami in 1.34:433 (2015).

History

References 

Motorsport venues in Santa Fe Province